Naïs Micoulin is a 1907 drame lyrique by Alfred Bruneau to a libretto after the 1884 novel by Émile Zola.

References

Operas
1907 operas
French-language operas
Operas by Alfred Bruneau
Operas set in France
Operas based on novels